Gore is a surname. Notable people with the surname include:

People with the surname

A-E
Al Gore (born 1948), American politician, US Vice President, author, and environmental activist
Albert Gore Sr. (1907–1998), American lawyer and politician; father of Al Gore
Alan Gore (1926–2006), Australian-born British architectural designer and garden historian
Altovise Gore ( Altovise Davis; 1943–2009), American dancer and actress; wife of Sammy Davis Jr.
Arthur Gore (disambiguation), multiple individuals
Bill Gore (1912–1986), American chemist, chemical engineer, and businessman
Bobby Gore (1936–2013), American street gang leader and activist
Catherine Gore (1798–1861), British novelist and dramatist
Charles Gore (disambiguation), multiple individuals
Chester Gore (1893–1966), American film art director
Christopher Gore (disambiguation), multiple individuals
Constance Gore-Booth ( Constance Markievicz; 1868–1927), Irish nationalist, socialist revolutionary, politician, and suffragist
Craig Gore (born 1967), Australian entrepreneur
Damien Gore (born 1999), Irish Gaelic footballer
David Alan Gore (1957–2012), American serial killer
David Gore (disambiguation), multiple individuals
Delilah Gore (born 1962), Papua New Guinean politician
Derrick Gore (born 1994), American football player
Dev Gore (born 1997), American race car driver

F-L
Francis Gore (disambiguation), multiple individuals
Frank Gore (born 1983), American football player
Frank Gore Jr. (born 2002), American football player
Frederic Gore (chemist) (1860–1930), American chemist
Frederick Gore (1913–2009), British painter
George Gore (disambiguation), multiple individuals
Gordon Gore (1913–1987), American football player
Gore baronets, three baronetcies of Ireland
Graham Gore (1845–1847), British lieutenant and polar explorer 
Harold Gore (1891–1969), American college sports coach
Howard Mason Gore (1877–1947), American politician
Ian Gore (born 1968), English footballer
Jack Gore (1899–1971), Welsh international rugby player
Jack Gore (actor) (born 2005), American actor
James Howard Gore (1856–1939), American mathematician, author, and educator
Jason Gore (born 1974), American golfer
Jeff Gore (born ?), American physicist
John Gore (disambiguation), multiple individuals
Julie Gore (born 1958), Welsh darts player
Karenna Gore (born 1973), American lawyer and author; daughter of Al and Tipper Gore
Kristin Gore (born 1977), American author and screenwriter; daughter of Al and Tipper Gore
Laura Gore (1918–1957), Italian actor and voice actor
Les Gore (1914–1991), British footballer
Lesley Gore (1946–2015), American singer, songwriter, actress, and activist
Lovie Gore (1904–1980), American politician

M-R
MacKenzie Gore (born 1999), American baseball player
Madhav Sadashiv Gore (1921–2010), Indian social scientist, writer, and academic administrator
Mahlon Gore (1837–1916), American politician and newspaper editor
Margot Gore (1913–1993), British airwoman and osteopath.
Marshall Lee Gore (1963–2013), American murderer and rapist
Martin L. Gore (born 1961), British songwriter, musician, singer, record producer, remixer, and DJ
Michael Gore (disambiguation), multiple individuals
Mrinal Gore (1928–2012), Indian socialist leader and politician
Nathan Gore (born 2005), Belgian musician
Nikki Gore (born 2000), Australian rules footballer
Paul Gore (disambiguation), multiple individuals
Pauline LaFon Gore (1912–2004), American lawyer and politician; mother of Al Gore
Ralph Gore (disambiguation), multiple individuals
Reg Gore (1913–1996), British footballer
Robert Gore (disambiguation), multiple individuals
Rohit Gore (born 1977), Indian information technology specialist and author
Ross Gore (1869–1925), New Zealand sportsman
Ryan Gore (born ?), American musical engineer, sound mixer, and producer

S-Z
Sandy Gore (born 1950), Australian actor
Shane Gore (born 1981), British footballer
Shaun Gore (born 1968), British footballer and coach
Shawn Gore (born 1987), Canadian football player
Simon Gore (born 1988), Welsh musician
Spencer Gore (artist) (1878–1914), British painter
Spencer Gore (sportsman) (1850–1906), British tennis player and cricketer; first Wimbledon tennis championship winner
Stacy Gore (born 1963), American football player
Steve Gore (born ?), British magician
St George Richard Gore (1812–1871), Irish noble-born Australian grazier and politician
Suresh Gore (1965–2020), Indian politician
Sylvia Gore (1944–2016), British footballer and coach
Terrance Gore (born 1991), American baseball player
Thomas Gore (1870–1949), American anti-war and disabilities activist, and politician
Tipper Gore (born 1948), American social issues advocate author, and photographer; wife of Al Gore
Tommy Gore (born 1953), British footballer
Walter Gore (1910–1979), British ballet dancer, company director, and choreographer
William Gore (disambiguation), multiple individuals

See also
Gore (given name)
Richard Corben (pen-name: Gore; 1940–2020), American illustrator and comic book artist

Similar surnames
Gohr (surname)
Gore-Browne (surname)
Gorer (surname)
Goring (surname)
Göring (surname)